Lionel is a contract bridge bidding convention used in defense against an opposing 1NT openings. Using Lionel, over a 1NT opening of the opponents:
 a double is conventional and denotes spades and a lower suit (4-4 or longer),
 a 2/2 overcall denotes hearts and the suit bid (4-4 or longer), and
 a 2/2 overcalls is natural.
Any of the overcalls denote high-card strength corresponding to 12+ (or good 11) high card points.

The convention is named after Lionel Wright from New Zealand who published it in the International Popular Bridge Monthly magazine of May 1993.

Responses
Following the Lionel double, the partner of the double responds as follows:

(1NT) - dbl - (pass) - ??

pass = 10+ hcp, all subsequent doubles for penalty

2 = pass-or-correct bid (doubler to pass or bid second suit)

2 = Non-forcing, diamond length (typically 5+) with heart tolerance. Doubler can bid 2 with hearts as second suit and less than two diamonds.

2 = Natural, non-forcing

2 = Weak Raise

2NT = Invitational spade raise without a singleton side suit

3// = Invitational spade raise with singleton or void in bid suit

3 = preemptive raise

After a minor suit Lionel overcall, the responses are straightforward. For instance:

(1NT) - 2 - (pass) - ??

Pass = to play

2 = to play

2 = weak raise

2 = to play

2NT = invitational heart raise

3 = preemptive

3 = preemptive

Advantages/disadvantages
Like using Brozel, CoCa or DONT, using Lionel has the consequence of losing the penalty double over opponent's 1NT. Although this is often seen as a loss, Lionel Wright argued that this loss turns into an advantage as it opens the possibility to defend 1NT doubled with split points between you and your partner. As a balanced holding of the majority of points is far more likely to occur than holding the majority of points in an imbalanced way, a conventional non-penalty double over 1NT holds the potential of paying-off on many hands. Also, non-penalty doubles are more difficult to deal with than traditional business doubles.

See also
List of defenses to 1NT

References

Bridge conventions